Vjačeslavs Giruckis (born 15 February 1989) is a Latvian motorcycle speedway rider who rides for Lokomotiv Daugavpils.

Speedway Grand Prix results

Career details

World Championships 
 Individual World Championship (Speedway Grand Prix)
 2009 - notclassify (track reserve at Latvian SGP)
 Team World Championships (Speedway World Team Cup and Speedway World Cup)
 2007 - 3rd place in Qualifying round 1
 2008 - 3rd place in Qualifying round 1
 2009 - 2nd place in Qualifying round 2
 Individual U-21 World Championship
 2007 - 16th place in Qualifying Round 3
 2009 -  Goričan - 15th place (2 pts)

European Championships 

 European Pairs Championship
 2008 -  Natschbach-Loipersbach - 5th (11 pts)
 European Club Champions' Cup
 2009 - 3rd place in the Semi-Final
 2009 - 4th place in the Semi-Final
 Team U-19 European Championship
 2008 - 3rd place in Semi-Final 2

Domestic competitions 
 Team Polish Championship (League)
 2007 - 2nd place in the Second League for Daugavpils (Average 1.333)
 2008 - 5th place in the First League for Daugavpils (Average 1.107)
 2009 - for Daugavpils

See also 
 Latvia national speedway team

References

External links 
 (ru) Riders of Lokomotive Daugavpils
 (ru) Riders of Lokomotive Daugavpils 2010

Latvian speedway riders
1989 births
Living people
Sportspeople from Daugavpils